McIntosh is a town located in Washington County, Alabama, United States along U.S. Route 43. It was named for William McIntosh, a prominent Creek chief of the nineteenth century. The town was incorporated on April 7, 1970. The population as of the 2020 U.S. Census was 206, down from 238 in 2010.

McIntosh is one of the most Native American towns in Alabama, With over half of the Towns inhabitants reporting to be of Native descent in the 2020 census

The town and county have a high proportion of residents who are members of the MOWA Band of Choctaw Indians, a state-recognized tribe of people of the Muskogean-speaking language family.
It has one site, Andrews Chapel, listed on the National Register of Historic Places.

McIntosh is near the site of Aaron Burr's arrest in 1807 while the area was part of the Mississippi Territory. He was captured by U.S. Army Lt. Edmund P. Gaines in the town of Wakefield, a few miles to the north, and then confined to Fort Stoddert. A historic marker has been placed to document this event.

Geography 
McIntosh is located at 31°15'58" North, 88°1'53" West (31.265979, -88.031473).

Demographics 

As of the census of 2000, there were 244 people, 94 households and 62 families in the town. The racial makeup of the town was 55.23% Native American, 43.03% Black or African American, 1.33% White and 0.41% from two or more races. 0,41% of the population were Hispanic or Latino of any race.

There were 94 households, out of which 36.2% had children under the age of 18 living with them, 47.9% were married couples living together, 18.1% had a female householder with no husband present, and 33.0% were non-families. 30.9% of all households were made up of individuals, and 11.7% had someone living alone who was 65 years of age or older. The average household size was 2.60 and the average family size was 3.27.

In the town, the population was spread out, with 29.5% under the age of 18, 6.6% from 18 to 24, 24.6% from 25 to 44, 25.0% from 45 to 64, and 14.3% who were 65 years of age or older. The median age was 35 years. For every 100 females, there were 83.5 males. For every 100 females age 18 and over, there were 72.0 males.

The median income for a household in the town was $28,214, and the median income for a family was $39,167. Males had a median income of $31,429 versus $22,750 for females. The per capita income for the town was $14,023. 13.5% of the population and 10.0% of families were below the poverty line. Out of the total population, 22.2% of those under the age of 18 and 9.1% of those 65 and older were living below the poverty line.

Notable Person
Greg Wells, former Major League Baseball player

References

External links
PowerSouth Energy Cooperative's compressed air energy storage power plant (archived)
Tate & Lyle Sucralose plant EPA Report for 2003
"95 workers in McIntosh vote to join AFL-CIO"

Towns in Alabama
Towns in Washington County, Alabama
Superfund sites in Alabama